The 1978 South Pacific Championships was an Association of Tennis Professionals men's tournament held on outdoor grass courts at the Milton Courts in Brisbane, Queensland, Australia that was part of the  1978 Grand Prix tennis circuit. It was the fifth edition of the tournament and was held from 9 October until 16 October 1978. The final was postponed from Sunday to Monday due to rain. Unseeded Mark Edmondson won the singles title, his second at the event after 1976.

Finals

Singles
 Mark Edmondson defeated  John Alexander 6–4, 7–6
 It was Edmondson's 1st singles title of the year and the 3rd of his career.

Doubles
 Phil Dent /  John Alexander defeated  Syd Ball /  Allan Stone 6–3, 7–6

References

External links
 ITF tournament details

South Pacific Championships
South Pacific Championships, 1978
South Pacific Championships
South Pacific Championships
Sports competitions in Brisbane
Tennis in Queensland